Provincial elections were held in Slovak Province on 26 May 1935. They elections were marked by victory of Autonomous Bloc of Hlinka's Slovak People's Party, Slovak National Party, Autonomous Agrarian Union and others.

Results

 The Autonomous Bloc was composed of Hlinka's Slovak People's Party, the Slovak National Party, the Autonomous Agrarian Union and on national level Polish People's Party and the Polish Socialist Workers Party.

References

1935 elections in Czechoslovakia
Elections in Slovakia
Legislative elections in Czechoslovakia
May 1935 events
Election and referendum articles with incomplete results